Dalian Derbies (simplified Chinese: 大连德比; pinyin: Dàlián Débǐ) refers to various local derbies between the football teams of Dalian. The term specifically refers to individual matches between the teams, but can also be used to describe the general rivalry between the different clubs. Dalian Shide against Dalian Aerbin are ranked as the most ferocious Dalian Derbies.

Clubs 
As of 2023 season, there are one club in the Chinese Super League, China League One and China League Two that play in Dalian:
 Dalian Professional F.C. (Super League)
 Dalian Duxing F.C. (League Two)
Dalian Shide F.C., established in 1983, is a former professional football club based in Dalian with the longest history in the city. Other former football clubs based in Dalian in the first two highest league include Huochetou F.C., Dalian Yiteng F.C.(Jia-B 1995), Dalian Shunfa F.C.(Jia-B 1996), Liaoning F.C.(Jia-B 1998), Dalian Sidelong F.C.(Jia-B 2002), Dalian Changbo F.C.(China League One 2004-2005), Dalian Transcendence F.C. (China League One 2016-2018).

Shide-Aerbin Derbies 

Statistics as of 14 July 2012.

Yifang-Transcendence Derbies 

Statistics as of 15 October 2017.

References 

China football rivalries
Sports rivalries
Sport in Dalian